Piedras Gordas is a corregimiento in La Pintada District, Coclé Province, Panama. Its population as of 1990 was 3,648; its population as of 2000 was 3,638.

Part of the La Pintada district, Piedras Gordas is nestled in the Tabasará Mountains.

References

Corregimientos of Coclé Province